Tayfun Seven (born June 25, 1980 in İstanbul, Turkey) is a Turkish footballer who last played for the TFF Third League club 68 Yeni Aksarayspor as a forward or as an attacking midfielder.

References

1980 births
Living people
People from Üsküdar 
Turkish footballers
Turkey under-21 international footballers
Turkey youth international footballers
Bursaspor footballers
Gençlerbirliği S.K. footballers
Antalyaspor footballers
Konyaspor footballers
İstanbul Başakşehir F.K. players
Malatyaspor footballers
Boluspor footballers
Kartalspor footballers
Altay S.K. footballers
Adana Demirspor footballers
Turgutluspor footballers
Alanyaspor footballers
Footballers from Istanbul

Association football midfielders
Association football forwards